The Madura College established in 1856, is one of the oldest academic institutions in Madurai, India. It is an autonomous arts and science college affiliated to the Madurai Kamaraj University

History
The college started as a Zilla School in 1856 as an outcome of Wood's despatch of 1854. In 1880, a college Department was added under the affiliation of the University of Madras. The School and the College Departments were both taken over by 'Madura Native School Committee' and renamed itself as the 'Madura  Committee' in 1889.

Academic Programmes
The Madura College offers undergraduates and postgraduate programmes in arts and science affiliated to the Madurai Kamaraj University. The college has been accredited by National Assessment and Accreditation Council with the an "A" Grade (CGPA 3.15 out of 4).

Departments 

 Tamil
 Sanskrit
 Hindi
 English
 Sociology
 Philosophy
 Economics
 Mathematics
 Physics
 Chemistry
 Computer Science
 Zoology
 Botany
 Commerce
 Information Technology
 Bio-Technology
 Micro-Biology

Extension Activities 
The college offers the following outreach programmes:
 National Service Scheme
 National Cadet Crops
 Youth Red Cross
 Red Ribbon Club
 Adult Education and Extension Programme
 Physical Education

Alumni Association 
 Sri T. S. Rajam, former President of the Madras Music Academy
 Shri Jana Krishnamurthi

External links
Official website

References 

Colleges in Madurai
1856 establishments in British India
Colleges affiliated to Madurai Kamaraj University
Universities and colleges in Madurai
Academic institutions formerly affiliated with the University of Madras